The Terry Pratchett First Novel Award was a biennial award for the an unpublished science fiction novel written by a UK resident. It was sponsored by British author Terry Pratchett. The winner was chosen by a panel of judges including Pratchett. The prize was a £20,000 advance against a publishing contract with Pratchett's publishers, Transworld Publishers. The award ended with Pratchett's death in 2015.

Winners and nominees

2011

In 2011, the nominees were:

 Postponing Armageddon by Adele Abbott 
 The Platinum Ticket by Dave Beynon 
 Half Sick of Shadows by David Logan 
 Apocalypse Cow by Michael Logan 
 Lun by Andrew Salomon 
 The Coven at Callington by Shereen Vedam

The award was won jointly by David Logan, for Half Sick of Shadows and Michael Logan for Apocalypse Cow.

Postponing Armageddon also went on to be published by Barking Rain Press.

2013
In 2013 the nominees were:

 The Unspoken Death of the Amazing Flying Boy by Jean Burdett
 Bloodline by Sophie Constable
 The Hive Construct by Alexander Maskill
 The Way Through the Woods by Robin Pearson
 A Kill in the Morning by Graeme Shimmin
 The Shadows of Annwn by Catherine Whittle

The award was won by Alexander Maskill's The Hive Construct.

A Kill in the Morning also went on to be published by Transworld.

References

Science fiction awards
British speculative fiction awards
Lists of speculative fiction-related award winners and nominees
First book awards
Terry Pratchett